Club Social y Deportivo Juventus is a professional football club based in Esmeraldas, Ecuador.

Achievements
Serie B (1): 1989 E2
Segunda Categoría (1): 1987

External links
Profile at Ecuafutbol 

Association football clubs established in 1979
Football clubs in Ecuador
1979 establishments in Ecuador